Taraz or Tarz may refer to:

Taraz, Narmashir, Kerman Province (طرز - Ţaraz)
Tarz, Ravar, Kerman Province (طرز - Ţarz)
Taraz, Khuzestan (تراز - Tārāz)
Taraz, Markazi (طراز - Ţarāz)
Taraz, Razavi Khorasan (طراز - Ţarāz)